Vilev is an eroded lunar impact crater that is located on the far side of the Moon. It lies to the west of the much larger crater Chaplygin, and to the north of Marconi. Just to the northeast of Vilev is the small crater pair of van den Bos and Tamm. Slightly farther to the west is the larger crater pair of Pannekoek and Dellinger.

Vilev is significantly eroded, and the outer rim now forms a somewhat irregular ring of ridges about the interior floor. Near the center of the crater is a pair of smaller, cup-shaped impacts that are joined together along their outer rims. There is another small crater along the inner wall to the west-southwest.

Satellite craters
By convention these features are identified on lunar maps by placing the letter on the side of the crater midpoint that is closest to Vilev.

References

External links
 Digital Lunar Orbiter Photo Number I-115-H2

Impact craters on the Moon